Greendale may refer to:

Places

Australia
 Greendale, New South Wales, a suburb of Sydney
 Greendale, Victoria

Canada
 Greendale, Chilliwack, British Columbia
 Greendale Subdivision, Alberta

Ireland
 Greendale Community School, Kilbarrack, Dublin

New Zealand
 Greendale, New Zealand

Singapore
 Greendale Secondary School, a secondary school in Punggol

United Kingdom
 Greendale, Cheshire, a location in the U.K.

United States
 Greendale, Indiana, a city in southeast Indiana
 Greendale, Fort Wayne, Indiana, a neighborhood in Fort Wayne
 Greendale, Missouri 
 Greendale, Ohio
 Greendale, Wisconsin, a southern suburb of Milwaukee
 Greendale High School
 Greendale, a village located in northern Worcester, Massachusetts
 Greendale Mall, in the village
 Greendale Township, Michigan

Zimbabwe
 Greendale, Harare, a suburb of Harare

Fictional places
 Greendale, the setting for the comic strip Sabrina the Teenage Witch
 Greendale, the setting for the British children's television series Postman Pat
 Greendale, the setting for the 1985 film Better Off Dead
 Greendale, Colorado, the setting for the American television comedy series Community, 2009–2016
 Greendale Community College, the series' titular community college
 Greendale, the setting for the stories sang by Neil Young in the concept album of same name

Other
 Greendale (album), an album and a movie, both made in 2003, by Neil Young and Crazy Horse

See also
 
 Green Valley (disambiguation)
 Greenvale (disambiguation)
 Greendell (disambiguation)
 Grønnedal, Danish placenames sometimes Anglicized as "Greendale"